Quily (meaning "the forest") is a former commune in the Morbihan department of Brittany in north-western France. On 1 January 2016, it was merged into the new commune Val d'Oust. Its population was 359 in 2019. Inhabitants of Quily are called in French Quilyens.

See also
Communes of the Morbihan department

References

External links

Former communes of Morbihan